Andrés Antonio Ayub Valenzuela (born January 1, 1982) is an amateur Chilean Greco-Roman wrestler, who competes in the men's super heavyweight category.

Ayub became the first Chilean wrestler in history to compete at the Summer Olympics at the 2012 Summer Olympics in London. He qualified for the men's 120 kg class, after placing second from the Pan American Qualification Tournament in Kissimmee, Florida. He received a bye through to his round of sixteen match, before losing out to Georgia's Guram Pherselidze, who was able to score four points in two straight periods, leaving Ayub without a single point.

He won a silver medal at the 2015 Pan American Games in the Men's Greco-Roman 130 kg event.

References

External links
 
 NBC Olympics Profile

1982 births
Living people
Chilean male sport wrestlers
Olympic wrestlers of Chile
Wrestlers at the 2012 Summer Olympics
Wrestlers at the 2015 Pan American Games
Sportspeople from Santiago
Pan American Games silver medalists for Chile
Pan American Games medalists in wrestling
Medalists at the 2015 Pan American Games
20th-century Chilean people
21st-century Chilean people